Langsur is a municipality in the Trier-Saarburg district, in Rhineland-Palatinate, Germany.

Mesenich 

Mesenich is a small German village belonging to the Ortsgemeinde of Langsur. It is located on the north of the verbandsgemeinde, near the Sauertalbrücke, the bridge in which the Bundesautobahn 64, the motorway connecting Luxembourg City and Trier, crosses the Sauer. It is also near a solar park and a natural rock mine.

Wasserbilligerbrück 
Wasserbilligerbrück is another small German village belonging to the Ortsgemeinde of Langsur. It is located on the bridge across the Sauer connecting it to the Luxembourgish town of Wasserbillig.

References 

Municipalities in Rhineland-Palatinate
Trier-Saarburg